Proprioseiopsis dominigos is a species of mite in the family Phytoseiidae.

References

dominigos
Articles created by Qbugbot
Animals described in 1984